John Edward Frantz (born July 1, 1945) is a former American football center who played one season for the Buffalo Bills. He also played for the Orange County Ramblers.

Frantz was born on July 1, 1945 in Kokomo, Indiana. He went to Nevada Union High School and California for college. John was drafted in the 16th round (415th overall) by the Buffalo Bills in the 1968 NFL Draft. He only made two appearances with them. Frantz then played with the Orange County Ramblers of the Continental Football League. He wore number 51 with the Bills and 65 with the Ramblers.

References

Living people
1945 births
Buffalo Bills players
American football offensive linemen
California Golden Bears football players